The NACAC Cross Country Championships is an annual regional cross country running competition for athletes representing member nations of the North America, Central America and Caribbean Athletic Association (NACAC). The event was inaugurated in 2005 and was held in Florida, United States until 2009. The following two editions were held in Trinidad and Tobago.

The event comprises four separate races: an 8 km senior men's race, a 6 km senior women's race, a 6 km junior men's race and finally a 4 km junior women's race.

Between 1983-2003, the event was preceded by the Central American and Caribbean Cross Country Championships organized by the Central American and Caribbean Athletic Confederation (CACAC).

Editions 

†: The number of athletes and number of nations are according to unofficial counts within complete results lists.  The higher numbers that were published could also comprise coaches and/or officials.

Champions

See also
American Championships

References

External links
NACAC website
Official USATF championships page
2005–06 winners from GBR Athletics



 
Cross country running competitions
Cross country running in the United States
Athletics team events
Cross Country
Continental athletics championships